Aegialitis or Aegialites may refer to:

 Aegialitis, a genus of mangrove plants
 Aegialites, a genus of beetles
 Aegialitis Trin., a homonymous plant genus with the replacement name Aegialina
 Charadrius, a genus of birds